The Monument de L'Independance was built as a tribute to Togo’s independence from France on April 27, 1960. The structure is composed of a human silhouette carved within it and surrounded by promenades, palm trees, manicured lawns, fountains and a black gold iron fence.

References

External links

Buildings and structures in Lomé